Robert Obst (born 6 July 1995) is a Polish professional footballer who plays as a centre-back for Kotwica Kołobrzeg.

References

External links
 
 

Living people
1995 births
Sportspeople from Szczecin
Association football midfielders
Polish footballers
Polish expatriate footballers
Expatriate footballers in Germany
Ekstraklasa players
I liga players
II liga players
III liga players
Regionalliga players
Pogoń Szczecin players
Wigry Suwałki players
Ruch Chorzów players
Znicz Pruszków players
BSV Schwarz-Weiß Rehden players
Olimpia Grudziądz players
Kotwica Kołobrzeg footballers